Opisthacanthus is a genus of scorpions in the family Hormuridae occurring in Central and South America, the Caribbean, Africa and Madagascar.

Species
The following species are recognised in the genus Opisthacanthus:
 Opisthacanthus africanus Simon, 1876
 Opisthacanthus ambanja Lourenço, 2014
 Opisthacanthus andohahela Lourenço, 2014
 Opisthacanthus antsiranana Lourenço, 2014
 Opisthacanthus asper (Peters, 1861)
 Opisthacanthus autanensis Gonzalez-Sponga, 2004
 Opisthacanthus basutus Lawrence, 1955)
 Opisthacanthus borboremai Lourenço & Fe, 2003
 Opisthacanthus brevicauda Rojas-Runjaic, Borges & Armas, 2008
 Opisthacanthus capensis Thorell, 1876
 Opisthacanthus cayaporum Vellard, 1932
 Opisthacanthus daraisensis Lourenço, 2006
 Opisthacanthus diremptus (Karsch, 1879)
 Opisthacanthus elatus (Gervais, 1843)
 Opisthacanthus faillei Lourenço & Wilme, 2019
 Opisthacanthus heurtaultae Lourenço, 1980
 Opisthacanthus laevipes (Pocock, 1893)
 Opisthacanthus lamorali Lourenço, 1981
 Opisthacanthus lavasoa Lourenço, Wilme & Waeber, 2016
 Opisthacanthus lecomtei (Lucas, 1858)
 Opisthacanthus lepturus (Beauvois, 1805)
 Opisthacanthus lourencoi Ythier, 2022
 Opisthacanthus lucienneae Lourenço, 2006
 Opisthacanthus maculatus Lourenço, 2006
 Opisthacanthus madagascariensis Kraepelin, 1894
 Opisthacanthus milloti Lourenço & Goodman, 2008
 Opisthacanthus pauliani Lourenço & Goodman, 2008
 Opisthacanthus piceus Lourenço, 2006
 Opisthacanthus piscatorius Lawrence, 1955
 Opisthacanthus rugiceps Pocock, 1897
 Opisthacanthus rugulosus Pocock, 1896
 Opisthacanthus surinamensis Lourenço, 2017
 Opisthacanthus titanus Lourenço, Wilme & Waeber 2018
 Opisthacanthus valerioi Lourenço, 1980
 Opisthacanthus validus (Thorell, 1876
 Opisthacanthus weyrauchi Mello-Leitão, 1948

Current systematics
Subgenus Opisthacanthus Peters, 1861
I. cayaporum group
 Opisthacanthus cayaporum Vellard, 1932
 Opisthacanthus heurtaultae Lourenço, 1980
 Opisthacanthus weyrauchi Mello-Leitão, 1948
II. lepturus group
 Opisthacanthus lepturus (Beauvois, 1805)
 Opisthacanthus elatus (Gervais, 1844)
 Opisthacanthus valerioi Lourenço, 1980
 Opisthacanthus borboremai sp. n.
III. lecomtei group
 Opisthacanthus lecomtei (Lucas, 1858)
Subgenus Nepabellus Francke, 1974
I. africanus group
 Opisthacanthus africanus africanus Simon, 1876
 Opisthacanthus africanus pallidus Lourenço, 2003
 Opisthacanthus capensis Thorell, 1876
 Opisthacanthus diremptus (Karsch, 1879)
II. asper group
 Opisthacanthus asper (Peters, 1861)
 Opisthacanthus basutus Lawrence, 1955
 Opisthacanthus rugiceps Pocock, 1897
III. laevipes group
 Opisthacanthus laevipes (Pocock, 1893)
IV. rugulosus group
 Opisthacanthus lamorali Lourenço, 1981
 Opisthacanthus rugulosus Pocock, 1896
V. validus group
 Opisthacanthus piscatorius Lawrence, 1955
 Opisthacanthus validus Thorell, 1876
Subgenus Monodopisthacanthus Lourenço, 2001
I. madagascariensis group
 Opisthacanthus madagascariensis Kraepelin, 1894
 Opisthacanthus punctulatus Pocock, 1896

References

Scorpion genera
Hormuridae
Scorpions of South America